Christopher Richard Pfatenhauer is an American baseball coach and former catcher. He is the head baseball coach of the Utah Tech Trailblazers formerly called Dixie State. He played college baseball at the College of the Canyons in 1993 and 1994 before transferring and playing for the Wyoming Cowboys in 1995. He graduated from the University of Nevada at Las Vegas. He also served as the head coach of the College of the Ozarks Bobcats (2006–2007)

Playing career
Pfatenhauer attended Bonanza High School in Las Vegas, Nevada. As a member of the baseball team, Pfatenhauer was named the Southern Nevada High School Baseball Player of the Year as a senior in 1992. Following high school, Pfatenhauer enrolled at the College of the Canyons. Following his graduation from the College of the Canyons, Pfatenhauer continued his baseball career for the Wyoming.

Coaching career
Pfatenhauer was named the head coach of the Faith Lutheran Crusaders in 2000, leading them to a state championship in 2003.

Pfatenhauer was named an assistant coach for the Nevada Wolf Pack in 2009.

On August 18, 2012, Pfatenhauer was named the head baseball coach at Dixie State University, now called Utah Tech University.

Head coaching record

See also
 List of current NCAA Division I baseball coaches

References

External links
Dixie State Trailblazers profile

Living people
High school baseball coaches in the United States
College of the Canyons Cougars baseball players
Wyoming Cowboys baseball players
Glendale Vaqueros baseball coaches
Treasure Valley Chukars baseball coaches
Southern Nevada Coyotes baseball coaches
College of the Ozarks Bobcats baseball coaches
Chico State Wildcats baseball coaches
Nevada Wolf Pack baseball coaches
Utah Tech Trailblazers baseball coaches
Year of birth missing (living people)
Southwest Baptist University alumni
Baseball coaches from Nevada
University of Nevada, Las Vegas alumni